Samuel Lyon (20 November 1890 – December 1977) was an English professional footballer who played in the Football League for Barnsley and Hull City as a centre forward.

Personal life 
Lyon's younger brother Jack also became a footballer. After service in the Territorial Army between 1909 and 1913, Lyon served in the East Yorkshire Regiment during the First World War and suffered wounds which necessitated him spending 15 months in hospital. After the war, he worked as a wholesale fish merchant and played bowls, at which he represented Yorkshire.

Career statistics

References

1890 births
Sportspeople from Prescot
English footballers
Prescot Cables F.C. players
Association football forwards
English Football League players
British Army personnel of World War I
Hull City A.F.C. players
Barnsley F.C. players
East Yorkshire Regiment soldiers
1977 deaths
English merchants
English male bowls players
20th-century English businesspeople
Military personnel from Lancashire